The 1980–81 Kansas State Wildcats men's basketball team represented Kansas State University as a member of the Big Eight Conference in the 1980–81 NCAA Division I men's basketball season. The team was led by head coach Jack Hartman and played their home games at Ahearn Field House in Manhattan, Kansas. The Wildcats finished second in the conference regular season standings and received a bid to the NCAA tournament as No. 8 seed in the West region. The Wildcats beat No. 9 seed San Francisco in the opening round, then upset No. 1 seed Oregon State and No. 4 seed Illinois to reach the regional final where they lost to North Carolina in Elite Eight, 82–68. Kansas State finished with a record of 24–9 (9–5 Big Eight).

Roster

Schedule

|-
!colspan=12 style=| Regular season

|-
!colspan=12 style=| Big 8 Tournament

|-
!colspan=12 style=| NCAA Tournament

Source

Team players drafted into the NBA

References 

Kansas State
Kansas State
Kansas State Wildcats men's basketball seasons
1980 in sports in Kansas
1981 in sports in Kansas